Marcus Rivers (portrayed by child-actor Bobb'e J. Thompson) is a fictional 12-year-old character that was used by Sony Computer Entertainment America as part of their Step Your Game Up advertising campaign for the PlayStation Portable and PSPgo consoles in North America, much like the PlayStation 3's "It Only Does Everything" advertising campaign commercials with Kevin Butler. He started as the publicist of the PlayStation Portable division of Sony, responding to "Dear PSP" queries. The character was created by Deutsch LA, the advertising agency responsible for the campaign. The YouTube channel "marcuspsp" that hosted his videos, was closed on June 15, 2011 for an undisclosed reason.

Appearances
Marcus Rivers first appeared at E3 2010 in a promo called "Marcus meets Kevin" where Marcus claimed the PSP needs more publicity. Kevin agrees, and hires Marcus as the new PSP publicist. After this, his first "Step Your Game Up" television commercials ensued. Marcus also appeared in various YouTube videos titled "Don't Play That" where he talked about games that people should not waste their money on, instead instructing them they should get a PSP.

Like Kevin Butler, Marcus had a different title in each commercial. His first title was "PSP Gamer" before he got hired by Kevin Butler. His first title as the PSP publicist was "Deputy of Gameland Security" in a commercial for Metal Gear Solid: Peace Walker. He was later called  "Sibling Conflict Advisor" in a ModNation Racers PSP commercial and "Deputy of Great Game Deals" in a commercial promoting "$9.99 Games". "$9.99 Games" was the last commercial that Marcus Rivers appeared in.

See also
 Kevin Butler

References

Advertising characters
Male characters in advertising
Fictional businesspeople
PlayStation (brand)
Child characters in advertising
PlayStation Portable